Heterothele is a genus of South American and African tarantulas that was first described by Ferdinand Anton Franz Karsch in 1879.

Species
 it contains ten species, found in Africa and Argentina:
Heterothele affinis Laurent, 1946 – Congo, Tanzania
Heterothele atropha Simon, 1907 – Congo
Heterothele caudicula (Simon, 1886) – Argentina
Heterothele darcheni (Benoit, 1966) – Gabon
Heterothele decemnotata (Simon, 1891) – Congo
Heterothele gabonensis (Lucas, 1858) – Gabon
Heterothele honesta Karsch, 1879 (type) – Angola
Heterothele hullwilliamsi Smith, 1990 – Cameroon
Heterothele ogbunikia Smith, 1990 – Nigeria
Heterothele spinipes Pocock, 1897 – Tanzania

See also
 List of Theraphosidae species

References

Theraphosidae genera
Spiders of Africa
Spiders of South America
Taxa named by Ferdinand Karsch
Theraphosidae